Anthene leptines, Leptines ciliate blue, is a butterfly in the family Lycaenidae. It is found in Nigeria (the Cross River loop), Cameroon, Gabon, the Republic of the Congo, the Central African Republic and the Democratic Republic of the Congo (Equateur, Uele and Sankuru). The habitat consists of forests.

References

Butterflies described in 1874
Anthene
Butterflies of Africa
Taxa named by William Chapman Hewitson